The End Is Near is a doomsday prophecy sometimes seen written on signs. The phrase may refer to:

 The End Is Near (Five Iron Frenzy album), 2003
 The End Is Near (The New Year album), 2004
 The End Is Near (film), 2012

See also
 End time (disambiguation)